Denton House may refer to:

Denton House (Maryland), a house in Chestertown, Maryland
Denton House (New Hyde Park, New York), a historic house in New Hyde Park, New York

See also
George W. Denton House, a historic in Flower Hill, New York